Robert M. Boche  (February 21, 1921 - November 25, 2004)  was a member of the Wisconsin State Assembly.

Biography
Boche was born on February 21, 1921, in Rosemount, Minnesota. He graduated from Rosemount High School before attending Globe University/Minnesota School of Business. Boche moved to New Richmond, Wisconsin and became active in his local church, as well as the United Packinghouse Workers of America and the International Red Cross and Red Crescent Movement.

Career
Boche was elected to the Assembly in 1966 and was re-elected in 1968. He is a Republican.

References

People from Rosemount, Minnesota
People from New Richmond, Wisconsin
Republican Party members of the Wisconsin State Assembly
1921 births
2004 deaths
20th-century American politicians